Hori Karaka Tawhiti was a 19th-century Māori member of the New Zealand Parliament.

He represented the Northern Maori electorate from 1876 to 1879, when he was defeated by Hone Tawhai.

He was a Member of the Executive Council in the second Atkinson Ministry, from 28 November 1876 to 13 October 1877.

Notes

References 

New Zealand MPs for Māori electorates
Members of the Cabinet of New Zealand
Members of the New Zealand House of Representatives
Year of death missing
Year of birth missing
Unsuccessful candidates in the 1879 New Zealand general election
19th-century New Zealand politicians